The Nation's Library of the Presidency, also commonly referred to as the Presidential Library, is the largest library in Turkey, with a collection of over 4 million printed books and over 120 million electronic editions published in 134 languages. The Presidential Library, which has the largest incipient collection in the world, was officially inaugurated by President Recep Tayyip Erdoğan on February 20, 2020. In addition to receiving a copy of materials printed in the country, as a depository library, the Presidential Library also receives books, in collaboration with the Foreign Ministry, from every country where Turkey has a diplomatic mission.

Located inside the Presidential Complex, the Library is 125,000 square meters and can accommodate up to 5,000 readers at a time. The library building is decorated with white and pink marble, designed with traditional Seljuk, Ottoman and contemporary motifs.

History 
The Library project was spearheaded by President Recep Tayyip Erdoğan in 2016 through the efforts of Turkish intellectuals, librarians, and NGOs, and inaugurated in February 2020.

The Presidential Library is the largest single library investment in the history of Turkish Republic. It also is the first library in Turkey to use integrated book conveyor system.

Famous patrons 

People who donated to the Library from their personal collection include: 
 President Erdoğan,
 Ambassadors of Uzbekistan, India, Chile, China, France, and Belarus,
 Historian İlber Ortaylı,
 Literary critic and historian Abdülbaki Gölpınarlı,  
 Oud master and composer Cinuçen Tanrıkorur, 
 Author Şefik Can, 
 Restaurateur Mehmet S. Tezcakin,
 Former Minister Hasan Celal Güzel, 
 Author and journalist Mehmed Şevket Eygi, 
 Art historian Mustafa Kamil Dürüst,
 Poet Mustafa Şerif Onaran,
 Director Muhsin Mete,
 Publisher Saman-Hatice Helvacıoğlu, and
 Sociologist Cemil Meriç.

In addition, French President Emmanuel Macron sent a special envoy to propose collaboration between the Presidential Library and his country's national library in the field of literature.

Accessibility 
The Presidential Library is designed to be accessible with wheelchair, and the country's leading telecommunications companies, Turkcell and Türk Telekom, prepared technology rooms for visually- and hearing-impaired users.

Cihannuma Hall 

The Cihannuma (World Atlas) Hall, decorated with 16 columns representing the 16 Great Turkic Empires, houses a collection of 200,000 books and has a seating capacity for 224 readers at a time in an area of 3,500 square meters. The dome of the Cihannuma Hall is 32 meters high and 27 meters wide.

Verses four and five of sura al-Alaq from the Quran, the first to be revealed to Muhammad, on the significance of reading and writing are inscribed on the dome of the hall: "O, kalemle yazmayı öğretendir, insana bilmediğini öğretendir" (He is the one who taught how to write with a pen, taught the human being what he did not know).

Books brought in collaboration with the Foreign Ministry on the culture and history of the countries where Turkey has a diplomatic mission are displayed in the World Library inside Cihannuma Hall.

Collections and exhibits

The Rare Books Library 

The Rare Books Library contains 50 thousand books, including Abdülbaki Gölpınarlı manuscripts and Mehmet Şevket Eygi Collections.

Research Library 
 

The Research Library has a collection of nearly 20 thousand books and 20 group study rooms.

Nasreddin Hodja Children's Library 

The Nasreddin Hodja Children's Library, named after the famous Seljuk satirist Nasreddin Hodja, is available for readers between the ages five and ten, with its collection of 25 thousand books and a multimedia section. The Children's Library provides activities related to traditional Turkish arts.

Youth Library 

The Youth Library, which is available for readers between the ages ten and fifteen, has a collection of 12 thousand books, and contains individual and group study rooms.

Multimedia Library 
The Multimedia Library contains 12 individual study rooms for four digital rooms that are equipped with touchscreen monitors and offer access to TRT archives and nearly 10 thousand audio-vision materials.

Periodicals Hall 
The Periodicals Hall has a collection of 1,550 magazines and newspapers and offers access to 90-day archive of 7,000 dailies and magazines from 120 countries in 60 languages in full page on touchscreen monitors that also features catalog search.

Reading Rooms 
The Reading Rooms have a collection of 300,000 books and 32 group study rooms and 8 lounges.

Conference Hall 
The Conference Hall, with its four simultaneous interpretation cabins, is designed to host international conferences and meetings.

Online, electronic and digital resources 
The Presidential Library offers access to: 
 45 million documents from the State Archives, 
 300 thousand manuscripts within the Manuscripts Institution of Turkey, and 
 550 thousand e-books, 6.5 million e-dissertations, 120 million articles, 60 thousand e-magazines from 46 databases, to which the Turkish Academic Network and Information Center and the Presidency are subscribed.

See also 

National Library of Turkey
Presidential Complex
List of national libraries
List of libraries in Turkey
List of libraries in Ankara
List of largest libraries
Turkish literature

References

External links 

 The Nation’s Library, Presidency of the Republic of Türkiye

Libraries in Turkey
2020 establishments in Turkey
Libraries established in 2020
Turkey
Research libraries
Deposit libraries
Libraries
Ankara
Yenimahalle, Ankara